Matros  is a term for sailor, seaman, mariner, or seafarer in several languages. It may also refer to:

People
 Matt Matros, an American poker player
 Juilão Mateus Paulo, an Angolan politician known also as Dino Matross

Military
 Matros, a rank in the Norwegian military
 Матрос (matros), an enlisted rank in the Bulgarian Navy
 Матрос (matros), an enlisted rank in the Ukrainian Navy
 Матрос (matros), an enlisted rank in the Russian and former Soviet Navy

See also
Matrose (disambiguation), German for "sailor"
Matross, an archaic English soldier of artillery
Matro, a Swiss mountain